Cadlina abyssicola is a species of sea slug or dorid nudibranch, a marine gastropod mollusk in the family Cadlinidae.

Distribution 
This species was described from deep water in New Caledonia.

References

Cadlinidae
Gastropods described in 2001